Acton Trussell, Bednall and Teddesley Hay is a civil parish in the district of South Staffordshire, Staffordshire, England. It contains 33 listed buildings that are recorded in the National Heritage List for England. Of these, two are at Grade II*, the middle of the three grades, and the others are at Grade II, the lowest grade. The parish contains the villages of Acton Trussell, Bednall, and Teddesley Hay, and the surrounding countryside. In the parish was Teddesley Hall, a country house, since demolished, and some of the listed buildings are associated with it.  The other listed buildings include two churches, memorials in the churchyards, houses and cottages, farmhouses and farm buildings, two road bridges, two bridges over the Staffordshire and Worcestershire Canal which runs through the parish, and a telephone kiosk.


Key

Buildings

References

Citations

Sources

Lists of listed buildings in Staffordshire
South Staffordshire District